Ludia is a video game development company.

Ludia  may also refer to:

 Ludia (moth), a genus of moths in family Saturniidae
 Ludia (plant), a plant genus in family Salicaceae